Blaine M. Yorgason (born 1942) is a Latter-day Saint novelist who has also written biographies.

Yorgason was born in Sanpete County, Utah.  He graduated from Brigham Young High School and then served as a missionary for the Church of Jesus Christ of Latter-day Saints, primarily in Chicago.  Yorgason has bachelor's and master's degrees from Brigham Young University (BYU).  He was a seminary teacher in the Church Educational System from 1970 to 1977 and taught at BYU from 1977 to 1980.

Among his works are Windwalker which was made into a 1980 film of the same name and Chester, I Love You (written with his brother, Brent Yorgason) which was adapted for film as The Thanksgiving Promise.  Yorgason has also written a biography of John Taylor.

Bibliography 
This is a list of books written by Yorgason. Some of these books were co-authored. Co-writers include: Brent Yorgason, Carl Eaton, Tami Yorgason, Sunny Oaks, Richard Schmutz, and Douglas Alder.
 Miracles and the Latter-day Saint Teenager (1974)
 Charlie's Monument (1976)
 Others (1978)
 Bishop's Horse Race (1979)
 Massacre At Salt Creek/The Courage Covenant/And Should We Die (1979)
 Windwalker (1979)
 A Town Called Charity (1980)
 The Krystal Promise (1981)
 Seeker of the Gentle Heart (1982)
 Double Exposure (1982)
 Chester, I Love You/The Thanksgiving Promise (1983)
 Miracle (1983)
 Brother Brigham's Gold (1984)
 Ride the Laughing Wind (1984)
 Shadowtaker (1985)
 The Loftier Way/Tales From the Book of Mormon (1985)
 Becoming (1986)
 Bfpstk and the Smile Song/Into The Rainbow (1986)
 Seven Days For Ruby (1986)
 The Eleven Dollar Surgery (1986)
 The Greatest Quest (1987)
 In Search of Steenie Bergman (1988)
 Pardners (1988)
 The Gospel Power Series (1989) - 12 Pamphlet Books
 Decision Point (1989)
 Here Stands a Man (1990)
 Spiritual Survival in the Last Days (1990)
 The Warm Spirit (1990)
 Prayers on the Wind/Storm (1991)
 Secrets (1992)
 To Soar With Eagles (1993)
 Spiritual Progression in the Last Days (1994)
 Tarred and Feathered (1994)
 One Tattered Angel (1995)
 Ascending/Angus Austin Rising (1996)
 Hearts A Fire: At All Hazards (1997)
 Hearts A Fire: Fort on the Firing Line (1999)
 New Evidences of Christ in America (1999)
 Gabriel's Well (2000)
 Hearts A Fire: Curly Bill's Gift (2000)
 Harold B. Lee (2001)
 Joseph F. Smith (2001)
 John Taylor (2002)
 Girl At the Crossing (2002)
 I Need Thee Every Hour (2003)
 Finding Mercie (2010)
 All That Was Promised: The St. George Temple and the Unfolding of the Restoration (2013) with Richard A. Schmutz and Douglas D. Alder.

Sources
 
BY High Alumni article on Yorgason
Barnes and Noble listing for Yorgason

References

1942 births
20th-century Mormon missionaries
American Latter Day Saint writers
American Mormon missionaries in the United States
20th-century American novelists
American male novelists
Brigham Young University alumni
Brigham Young University faculty
Church Educational System instructors
Living people
People from Sanpete County, Utah
Novelists from Utah
Latter Day Saints from Utah
American male non-fiction writers
20th-century American male writers
Date of birth missing (living people)
Brigham Young High School alumni